Didem Sarıca, married Süer, (born March 4, 1977) is a former Turkish female professional basketball player.

See also
 Turkish women in sports

References

External links
Profile at fiba.com
Profile at eurobasket.com

1977 births
Living people
Sportspeople from İzmir
Turkish women's basketball players
Power forwards (basketball)
Small forwards
Galatasaray S.K. (women's basketball) players